Malaysia Forever is a folk song written by Bobby Gimby in the early 1960s. The title of the song is a rough translation of the Malay phrase, "Hidup Malaysia" (literally, Long Live Malaysia). It was written to celebrate the formation of Malaysian federation in 1963. Tunku Abdul Rahman, the then Prime Minister of the Federation called the song Malaysia Forever as the unofficial national anthem of Malaysia. The song was recorded in Kuala Lumpur and Singapore.

Overview
Malaysia Forever is a folk song with a length of 2 minutes sung by the Choir of the Marymount Vocational School in Singapore. On the days before the merger, it was taught to school children prior to merger and became an instant hit when it was broadcast over the air-waves of all parts of Malaysia. The song was broadcast on nationwide radio every National Day until Singapore's expulsion from Malaysia on 9 August 1965 due to political and economical disputes, in which the song quickly lost its popularity among both sides.

See also
 Singapore in Malaysia
 Malaysia Day

References

External links
 A page concerning Malaysia Forever though Gimby's daughter as a correspondent

Folk songs
Malaysian patriotic songs
English-language Malaysian songs